George Myron Clark (May 19, 1891 – November 14, 1940) was a Major League Baseball pitcher. In 11 career games, he had a 0–1 record with a 9.00 ERA. He batted right and threw left-handed.

Clark was born in Smithland, Iowa, and died in Sioux City, Iowa.

External links

1891 births
1940 deaths
New York Yankees players
Major League Baseball pitchers
Baseball players from Iowa
Iowa State Cyclones baseball players
Des Moines Boosters players
Topeka Jayhawks players